Ramalde is a Portuguese civil parish of the municipality of Porto. The population in 2011 was 38,012, in an area of 5.83 km2.

The Hospital da Prelada, a reputed private hospital of Porto city established in 1988 which operates for the state-run national health service of Portugal, the head office of Portuguese party Iniciativa Liberal (IL) and Boavista FC, a major sports club from Porto whose history is full of important achievements, are all based in Porto's Ramalde civil parish.

References

Parishes of Porto